Buenavista de Valdavia is a municipality located in the province of Palencia, Castile and León, Spain. As of January 2015, the municipality has a population of 354 inhabitants.

References

Municipalities in the Province of Palencia